Jackson Pond is a freshwater frozen pond midway between the terminus of Wright Upper Glacier and Anvil Pond in the Labyrinth, McMurdo Dry Valleys, Antarctica. It was named by the Advisory Committee on Antarctic Names in 2004 after J.K. Jackson of the Department of Geology at Northern Illinois University, DeKalb, Illinois, a member of the core legging and processing team during the McMurdo Dry Valleys Drilling Project, 1974–75.

References

Lakes of Victoria Land
McMurdo Dry Valleys